The Turks in Abkhazia, also known as Abkhazian Turks, are people of Turkish ancestry  who have had a thriving presence in Abkhazia since the rule of the Ottoman Empire. Today, the community numbers about 10,000-15,000.

Notable people 
 Almasbei Kchach
 Konstantin Ozgan

See also 
Turkish minorities in the former Ottoman Empire
Meskhetian Turks

References

Bibliography 
 

Abkhazia
Ethnic groups in Abkhazia
Muslim communities in Europe
Abkhazia